Zemgale Planning Region is a planning region of Latvia located within the south-center of the country. Established in 2002, the planning region contains 22 municipalities: 20 local governments and two major cities, the largest being Jelgava. As of 2020, the region's population was 228,409.

Geography 
Zemgale is located within the historical region of Semigallia, which encompasses the southern-central portion of the country. Zemgale shares a  border with the Republic of Lithuania, which sits directly to its south.

Zemgale is noted for its rich soil, unpolluted resources, and natural areas; 40% of the region is forested.

Population 
As of 2010, the region has a population of 280,494, which makes up 12.5% of Latvia's total population. About half of Zemgale's population lives in the region's two largest cities: Jelgava and Jekabpils.

References 

Subdivisions of Latvia